Ryan Hoffman (born 26 January 1984) is an Australian former professional rugby league footballer who played in the 2000s and 2010s.

Early life
Hoffman was born in Canberra, Australian Capital Territory. His father, Jay Hoffman, played professional football for the Canberra Raiders, representing Queensland in the pre-Origin era.

Hoffman attended the renowned rugby league school  St Gregory's College in Campbelltown, New South Wales.

Club career

Melbourne Storm (2003–2010)

Hoffman started his NRL career with the Melbourne Storm in 2003. In 2006, his improving form led to him being selected for the New South Wales City Origin side for the first time. It also earned him the Storm's Forward of the Year award. In addition, he was named in the second row for Melbourne Storm's team of the decade.

Following the 2006 NRL Grand Final loss to the Brisbane Broncos, Hoffman sat in the middle of Telstra Stadium in tears, an image which was printed in newspapers all around Australia.

In 2007, Hoffman was part of the Melbourne team which won the Grand Final, defeating Manly by 34–8. He played in the 2009 NRL Grand Final victory over the Parramatta Eels, scoring the opening try. In 2010, both premierships which Hoffman won with Melbourne were stripped due to the club's breaches of the salary cap between 2006-2010.

Wigan Warriors (2011)
In July 2010, Hoffman signed with Super League club Wigan Warriors, where he was given the #16 shirt and replaced Phil Bailey at second-row.

Hoffman scored on his first-grade début for the side at the season-opening Magic Weekend event against the club's rivals, St Helens R.F.C.

He then featured in the 2011 World Club Challenge where Wigan lost 15–21 to St George Illawarra Dragons in their first home game of the season.

In rounds 4 and 5, Hoffman scored a try apiece against Hull F.C. and Huddersfield Giants respectively. Another try at Hull Kingston Rovers in Round 9 made his record four tries from ten starting games for Wigan.

Hoffman played in the 2011 Challenge Cup Final victory over the Leeds Rhinos at Wembley Stadium, playing as a second-row forward, helping the side to defeat Leeds 28-18.

Melbourne Storm (2012–2014)
Hoffman signed a new deal to return to the NRL and the Melbourne Storm in 2012. Midseason, he captained the team for four games in the absence of Cameron Smith, becoming the 18th player to captain the club. He played in their 2012 Premiership victory over Canterbury-Bankstown, scoring the first try of the game.

He set up the first try for teammate Billy Slater in the 2013 World Club Challenge victory over Leeds.

New Zealand Warriors (2015–2017)
On 7 May 2014 Hoffman announced that he had signed a three-year deal with the New Zealand Warriors, worth an estimated $1.6 million.

In April 2015 Hoffman played his 250th NRL career game against his former club Melbourne Storm at AAMI Park.

On 17 February 2016 Hoffman was named the new club captain, after incumbent captain Simon Mannering stepped down from the role. Hoffman is the second Australian to have captained the New Zealand club, after Steve Price.

On 1 February 2017, new Warriors coach Stephen Kearney announced that Hoffman would be replaced as captain and would not be re-signed for the 2018 season.

On 10 June, Hoffman became just the 27th player (in the game) to reach the 300th game milestone. In his 300th game, he scored the first try of the game (in the first half) and kicked a conversion goal (to Hingano's try, in the 80th minute) during the Warriors' 34-12 round 14 win against the Gold Coast Titans.

Melbourne Storm (2018)
On 10 October 2017 the Melbourne Storm announced that Hoffman would return to the club on a 1-year deal that saw him end his playing career at the club. On Tuesday the 3rd of July Hoffman publicly announced that he was retiring at the end of the 2018 NRL season.

Representative career
While attending Campbelltown St. Gregory's College, Hoffman played for the Australian Schoolboys team in 2002.

He was named as the 18th man for Australia in the 2007 ANZAC Test against New Zealand. In October, 2007, he was selected in the run-on side for the Centenary Test against New Zealand in Wellington.

Again as 18th man, Hoffman was on stand-by for the 2007 New South Wales State of Origin Team in game 1 of the series. He was selected on the bench in game 2 and 3 of the same series.

In 2008, Hoffman was named in the New South Wales starting side in all three Origin matches.

In August 2008, he was named in the Australia national rugby league team preliminary 46-man Kangaroos squad for the 2008 Rugby League World Cup.

He was selected for City in the City vs Country match on 8  May 2009.

Statistics

NRL
 Statistics are correct to the end of the 2018 season

State of Origin

Australia

Honours
Melbourne Storm
 2006 NRL Grand Final Runner-up
 2007 NRL Grand Final Winners
 2008 World Club Challenge Runner-up
 2009 NRL Grand Final Winners
 2010 World Club Challenge Winners
 2012 NRL Grand Final Winners
 2013 World Club Challenge Winners
 2018 World Club Challenge Winners

Wigan Warriors
 2011 World Club Challenge Runners-Up
 2011 Challenge Cup Winners

Individual
 2012 - Melbourne Storm - Forward of the Year
 2013 - Spirit of ANZAC Medal
 2014 - Brad Fittler Medal

Footnotes

External links
Melbourne Storm profile

1984 births
Living people
Australia national rugby league team players
Australian expatriate sportspeople in England
Australian republicans
Australian rugby league players
Melbourne Storm players
New South Wales City Origin rugby league team players
New South Wales Rugby League State of Origin players
New Zealand Warriors captains
New Zealand Warriors players
NRL All Stars players
Prime Minister's XIII players
Rugby league players from Canberra
Rugby league second-rows
Wigan Warriors players